The 2018 general election was held in the U.S. state of Oklahoma on November 6, 2018. All of Oklahoma's executive officers were up for election as well as the state's five seats in the United States House of Representatives, half of the 48 seats in the Oklahoma Senate and all 101 seats in the Oklahoma House, and five offices in each of Oklahoma's 77 counties. Voter turnout was 42.5% of the eligible population, a 12.6% increase over the 2014 midterms but still the third lowest in the nation.

Due to Gary Johnson's results in the 2016 presidential election, the Oklahoma Libertarian Party had ballot status to run candidates in 2018. This was the first time an alternative party has been able to participate in mid-term elections in the state since 1998. Five Independents, led in a loosely coordinated effort by former Oklahoma Democratic Party chair Ivan Holmes, were candidates for statewide executive offices.

The ballot order was determined by random drawing for placement of candidates by party. Results of the drawing on July 12 were that Libertarian candidates would be placed first, Republicans second, and Democrats third. By statute, Independents are always listed after partisan candidates.

State Constitutional Officers

Governor

Incumbent Republican Governor Mary Fallin was term-limited and could not seek re-election to a third term.

Lieutenant governor
In Oklahoma, the governor and lieutenant governor are elected separately. Incumbent Republican lieutenant governor Todd Lamb was term-limited and could not seek re-election to a third  term.

Republican primary

Declared 
Eddie Fields, Oklahoma State Senator from the 10th District
 Dominique DaMón Block Sr., 2010 candidate for Oklahoma State House
Dana Murphy, Oklahoma Corporation Commission member and geologist
 Matt Pinnell, former national state party director for the Republican National Committee and former Oklahoma Republican Party chair

Results

Polling

Democratic primary

Declared  
Anastasia Pittman, Oklahoma State Senator from the 48th District
 Anna Dearmore, 2016 Democratic candidate for District 16 of the Oklahoma House of Representatives

Declined 
 Jerry McPeak, former state representative

Results

Independent

Declared  
Ivan Holmes, 2014 Democratic candidate for Oklahoma Superintendent of Public Instruction

General election

Polling

Results

Attorney general
Incumbent Republican attorney general Scott Pruitt was term-limited and could not run for a third term. Pruitt resigned on February 17, 2017, upon being confirmed as Administrator of the Environmental Protection Agency.

Republican primary

Declared  
Nominee
Mike Hunter, incumbent attorney general of Oklahoma
Eliminated in runoff
 Gentner Drummond, combat pilot in Operation Desert Storm
Eliminated in primary
Angela Bonilla, attorney

Results

Polling

Democratic primary

Declared  
 Mark Myles, defense attorney and 2010 candidate for US Senate.

General election

Polling

Results

Treasurer
Incumbent Republican State Treasurer Ken A. Miller was term-limited and could not run for a third term.

Republican primary

Declared  
Randy McDaniel, state representative for the 83rd District

Independent

Declared  
 Charles De Coune, Lending Manager at Oklahoma Water Resources Board

General election

Polling

Results

State Auditor and Inspector
Incumbent Republican State Auditor and Inspector Gary Jones was term-limited and could not run for a third term.

Republican primary

Declared 
 Cindy Byrd, Deputy State Auditor
 Charlie Prater, Businessman
 John Uzzo, 2016 Democratic Oklahoma State Senate District 9 candidate

Results

Polling

Libertarian primary
 Dr. John Yeutter, Professor of accounting at Northeastern State University

General election

Polling

Results

Superintendent of Public Instruction

Republican primary

Declared  
 Will Farrell
 Joy Hofmeister, Incumbent Superintendent of Public Instruction
Linda Murphy, education advisor to former governor Frank Keating and former deputy commissioner of the Oklahoma Department of Labor

Results

Polling

Democratic primary

Declared  
 John Cox, Peggs Public School Superintendent and Superintendent of Public Instruction nominee in 2014

Independent

Declared  
 Larry Huff, retired educator

General election

Polling

Results

Commissioner of Insurance
Incumbent Republican Insurance Commissioner John D. Doak was term-limited and could not run for a third term.

Republican primary

Declared  
Donald Chasteen, insurance agent
 Glen Mulready, state representative for the 68th District

Results

Democratic primary

Declared  
 Kimberly Fobbs, former member of Oklahoma's Judicial Nominating Commission

General election

Polling

Results

Commissioner of Labor
Republican labor commissioner Mark Costello, who was re-elected to a second term in 2014, was fatally stabbed on August 23, 2015. Attorney General Scott Pruitt's chief of staff Melissa Houston was appointed to serve for the remainder of the term, but pledged that she would not run for election in 2018.

Republican primary

Declared  
Cathy Costello, widow of former labor commissioner Mark Costello & Mental Health Advocate
Leslie Osborn, state representative for the 47th District
Keith Swinton, entrepreneur

Declined 
 Melissa Houston, Oklahoma Labor Commissioner

Results

Polling

Democratic primary

Declared  
Fred Dorrell, Human Resources Labor Specialist for Spirit AeroSystems
Sam A Mis-Soum, CVO at Mossad Industries Inc.

Results

Independent

Declared  
Brandt Dismukes

General election

Polling

Results

Corporation commissioner
One of the three seats on the Oklahoma Corporation Commission was up for election. Incumbent Republican commissioner Bob Anthony, the chairman of the commission, ran for re-election to a sixth six-year term in office.

Republican primary

Declared 
Bob Anthony - incumbent corporation commissioner
Brian Bingman - former president pro tempore of the Oklahoma State Senate

Results

Polling

Democratic primary

Declared 
 Blake Cummings, oil and gas field sales analyst
 Ashley Nicole McCray
 Ken Reich, retired educator
 Beau Williams, attorney

Primary Results

Primary Runoff Results

Independent

Declared  
 Jackie Short, attorney

General election

Polling

Results

Congress

United States House of Representatives

Oklahoma's five seats in the United States House of Representatives were be up for election in 2018.

State legislature

Senate

House of Representatives

State questions
State questions are ballot propositions to proposed either a legislative measure or an amendment to the Oklahoma Constitution. State questions are filed with the Oklahoma Secretary of State by either order of the legislature (termed a "legislative referendum") or directly by the people of Oklahoma (termed an "initiative petition"). The secretary of state assigns a number to the state question and notifies the State Election Board of the propositions submission. The governor, by executive proclamation, sets the election date for submission of the state questions to the people.

State Question 788

Oklahoma State Question 788 was an initiative petition which sought to legalize the licensed use, sale, and growth of marijuana in Oklahoma for medical purposes.

State Question 793
Oklahoma State Question 793 was an initiative petition which sought to amend the Oklahoma Constitution to allow optometrists to practice within a mercantile establishment.

State Question 794
Oklahoma State Question 794 was a legislative referendum which sought to amend the Oklahoma Constitution to expand the rights of victims of crime.

State Question 798
Oklahoma State Question 798 was a legislative referendum which sought to amend the Oklahoma Constitution to provide that the governor and lieutenant governor be jointly elected.

State Question 800
Oklahoma State Question 800 was a legislative referendum which sought to amend the Oklahoma Constitution to create a new trust fund consisting of a portion of all taxes collected against the extraction of oil and gas resources.

State Question 801
Oklahoma State Question 801 was a legislative referendum which sought to amend the Oklahoma Constitution to allow voters within a local school district to expand the permissible use of property taxes to include school operations rather than just for school buildings.

References

External links
Official Lieutenant Governor campaign websites
Ivan Holmes (I) for Lt. Governor
Anastasia Pittman (D) for Lt. Governor
Matt Pinnell (R) for Lt. Governor

Official Attorney General campaign websites
Mike Hunter (R) for Attorney General
Mark Myles (D) for Attorney General

Official State Treasurer campaign websites
Charles de Coune (I) for Treasurer
Randy McDaniel (R) for Treasurer

Official State Auditor and Inspector campaign websites
Cindy Byrd (R) for Auditor
John Yeutter (L) for Auditor

Official Superintendent of Public Instruction campaign websites
John Cox (D) for Superintendent
Joy Hofmeister (R) for Superintendent

Official Commissioner of Insurance campaign websites
Kimberly Fobbs (D) for Insurance Commissioner
Glen Mulready (R) for Insurance Commissioner

Official Commissioner of Labor campaign websites
Brandt Dismukes (I) for Labor Commissioner
Fred Dorrell (D) for Labor Commissioner
Leslie Osborn (R) for Labor Commissioner

Official Corporation Commissioner campaign websites
Bob Anthony (R) for Corporation Commissioner
Ashley Nicole McCray (D) for Corporation Commissioner

 
Oklahoma